Sevda Alizadeh (born 1 September 1987), known professionally as Sevdaliza, is an Iranian-Dutch singer, songwriter, record producer, visual artist, and director. In 2015, she released two EPs, The Suspended Kid and Children of Silk. While her music is typically in English, she released her first Persian-language song, "Bebin", in early 2017 in protest of Executive Order 13769. Her debut album, ISON, was published on 26 April 2017 via her record label, Twisted Elegance. In 2018, she released a third EP, The Calling, followed by her second studio album, Shabrang, in 2020.

Life and career

Early life
Alizadeh was born on 1 September 1987 in Tehran, Iran. She is of Azerbaijani, Russian, and Persian descent. She moved with her family to the Netherlands at the age of five. At 16, she left home after obtaining a basketball scholarship, eventually playing on the Dutch national basketball team. She went to university, graduating with a master's degree in communications. Sevdaliza is fluent in Persian, Dutch, English, French, and Portuguese.

2014–2018: The Suspended Kid, Children of Silk and ISON
In March 2014, Sevdaliza released her single "Clear Air" along with a music video. It was later followed by "Sirens of the Caspian" and "Backseat Love". In January 2015, her extended play (EP), The Suspended Kid, was issued, which she had worked on for over a year and half. The title of the EP is about how people responded to Sevdaliza in social situations, saying "I realized that those things that deflect me from social situations—not getting along with your coach or your boss or whatever—it made me realize I had to choose a different path." The Suspended Kid was produced by Sevdaliza and Rotterdam-based producer and frequent collaborator, Mucky. In September, a music video for the last remaining track on the EP, the industrial R&B "That Other Girl", was released. In June, she released "Marilyn Monroe", which served as the lead single from her second EP, Children of Silk. The song has been characterized as trip hop and was accompanied by a music video which was released in March 2016. Children of Silk was released in November. Sevdaliza cited textures such as skin, glass, and silk as the main inspiration behind the EP. In May, Sevdaliza released a short film titled The Formula, which tells the story of how "the pain of losing an unborn child destroyed balance in marriage and leads to tragedy." Directed by Emmanuel Adjei, the short film features three songs by Sevdaliza, "The Formula", "The Language of Limbo" and "Mad Woman"; the latter was issued as a single the following year in October. A new single titled "Time" was released in the same month. In the following month, another single titled "Human" was released along with a music video. "Human", "Marilyn Monroe" and "The Language of Limbo" would later be included on Sevdaliza's debut studio album, ISON.

In January 2017, Sevdaliza released her first Persian-language song, "Bebin", in response to Executive Order 13769. She stated, "In protest of the inhumane political climate, I could not rest my head in privilege. I wrote 'Bebin' in Farsi (referring to Persian), to solidify. I stand strong with love. In this case I choose to avoid mainstream media, because I have no interest in part taking in a victimized concept. Take this message without lights, camera, action. I am solely a messenger. In the brain of love, there is no place for racism nor bigotry." In February, a music video was released for "Amandine Insensible", which showcases the limited roles women are expected to fill in modern culture. Sevdaliza said, "The story of Amandine explores the concept of 'identity' in a contemporary world that is rapidly changing due to the disappearance of 'boundaries'. Amandine is everything you want her to be. An extreme extraction of average life, representing a world where we have become so universal all feelings have disappeared. Paradoxically, this makes you feel uncomfortable. Her life takes place in an infinite white space, composed with minimal objects that represent different facets of the cycle of daily life." In April, "Hero" was released as the second single from her debut studio album, ISON. The album was released in April 2017, and is named after Comet ISON, a sungrazing comet.

In January 2018, Sevdaliza released a new track "Soul Syncable" and it was released on the day of the super blue moon. "Soul Syncable" is the first song from Sevdaliza, following her debut album ISON. In February, she released the track "Human Nature". "Soul Syncable" and "Human Nature" are part of her EP The Calling, which was released in March.

In May, she released a Portuguese-language version of her track "Human", titled "Humana", to celebrate and thank its 10 million views.

2019-present: Shabrang 
On March 8, 2019, Sevdaliza released a new single which would be the beginning of a new musical chapter in her career, "Darkest Hour". It was succeeded by the non-album single "Martyr" the following month.

Sevdaliza then released three singles in 2020, "Oh My God", "Lamp Lady" and "Joanna", before announcing her second studio album Shabrang, which released 28 August 2020. Shabrang also features the single "Human Nature", which also appeared on her 2018 extended play The Calling.

Artistry

Musical style and influences 
Sevdaliza's music incorporates electronic, alternative R&B, trip hop, experimental pop, and avant-pop. Critics have compared her music to the trip hop of Portishead with string arrangements recalling Siouxsie and the Banshees circa "Dazzle" and Homogenic-era Björk.

According to Sevdaliza, "I think my sound would mostly be described as pure and raw. I'm not necessarily drawn to a genre, but to a process, or towards a certain mood like melancholy. The interesting thing is that the music that my music gets compared to is not necessarily music I've listened to, which makes it super interesting. I was performing once, and a conservatory professor came to me after the show, saying that he could really hear that I draw inspiration from old Persian singers. I asked him, "Wow, that's really interesting. How do you hear that?," and he said because I use certain semitones and microtones when I sing. But I've never had a singing lesson in my life, and I've never listened to Persian music in my life! It's really interesting to me that some things just come to you unconsciously like that. It's like you have this brain and it's unconsciously and consciously registering everything and in combination with your DNA it just becomes... something."

Sevdaliza's music is inspired by ideas of womanhood, identity, and motherhood.

Music videos
Her album, ISON, is a visual album and has a video that is 1 hour, 6 minutes, and 28 seconds long. Unlike similar visual albums, the film is abstract and meant to be viewed in one sitting, as it subtly changes like a "moving painting". Her general goal with her music videos is to "make it vulnerable and more than human at the same time."

"Human"
Sevdaliza appears to be a satyr and an erotic dancer performing in a semi-abandoned large building with classical detailing in front of an audience sitting on a mezzanine. The audience consists of only men, who are clearly wealthy, being served food and receiving this seemingly private and exclusive performance. The time and place that this is occurring remains ambiguous, mostly because of the mysteriousness of Sevdaliza's semi-mythological character, who is dancing on dirt that has been plowed as in preparation for an animal race. Additionally, her outfit recalls that of Debra Paget in the 1959 film The Indian Tomb, a nod to old Hollywood nostalgia and popular roles women play catering to male sexual desire. The audience members sweat and watch cautiously, as if scared of her. Her video on YouTube is accompanied by the quote, 'the basic human need to be watched was once satisfied by god'. There is an official rendition of the song in Portuguese. The video for Human was directed by Emmanuel Adjei.

"Amandine Insensible"
Sevdaliza performs several archetypal figures of women in contemporary society. These archetypes are all solo and set against a bright white background, with watermarks and are meant to represent the limited roles accessible to women. As a commentary on the commercialization of everyday life, Sevdaliza sold clips from the music video to Shutterstock. There is the "confident, powerful woman active wear", "professional woman operator call center business", "glamorous sensual woman in silk garment", "confidant ethnic woman leather suit umbrella", and "glamorous woman wow white fur piano". Sevdaliza says that "The accessibility of information and matter has created a new universal language, in which commercial brands play a key role."

"Bluecid" 
Sevdaliza dances a slow tango-inspired duet with François Sagat in a large, ornately-decorated hall with a golden table set for two in the middle of the room. The video is written and directed by Sevdaliza and Zahra Reijs and was released in 2017.

Album art

ISON
The album art for ISON features a hyper-realistic bust of Sevdaliza herself, barely superimposed and upside down over a mannequin copy that appears to be covered with fresh bright red paint. The hair that is hanging upside down, drapes over the shoulder of the bright red bust. Both appear to be sweaty or wet. The silicone sculpture is by sculptor Sarah Sitkin. Stikin says "The idea is based around Sevdaliza being the mother to herself and her past lives. It carries her vulnerability stoically. Her features distorted, some omitted, some emphasized. A new form is repeated through her 16 children (number of songs) surrounding her."

Awards and nominations
{| class=wikitable
|-
! Award !! Year !! Category !! Work !! Result !! Ref. 
|-
| rowspan=3|Berlin Music Video Awards
| 2020
| Best Song
| "Habibi"
| 
|
|-
| rowspan=2|2022
| Best Director
| "Homunculus (Oh My God)"
| 
| rowspan=2|
|-
| Best Visual Effects
| "Everything Is Everything"
| 
|-
| rowspan=4|Shark Music Video Awards
| rowspan=4|2018
| Best Cinematography
| rowspan=3|"Shahmaran"
| 
|rowspan=4|
|-
| Writing/Idea/Concept 
| 
|-
| Best Music Video
| 
|-
| Best Color Grading 
| "Hear My Pain Heal"
|

Discography

Studio albums

Extended plays

Singles

Guest appearances

Videography

Music videos

Films

References

External links
 

1993 births
21st-century Dutch women singers
21st-century Dutch singers
Contemporary R&B singers
Dutch electronic musicians
Dutch singer-songwriters
Dutch women's basketball players
Dutch people of Iranian descent
Dutch people of Azerbaijani descent
Dutch people of Russian descent
Iranian electronic musicians
Iranian emigrants to the Netherlands
21st-century Iranian women singers
Iranian singer-songwriters
Living people
Singers from Tehran
Musicians from Rotterdam
Women in electronic music
Iranian people of Azerbaijani descent
Iranian people of Russian descent